Robert Thomas Fraley (January 25, 1953, Danville, Illinois) was Executive Vice President and Chief Technology Officer at Monsanto, where he helped to develop the first genetically modified seeds. He retired from Monsanto in June 2018.  He advocates for the use of GMO products to address global food insecurity and reduce the environmental footprint of agriculture.

Early life and education 

Fraley grew up on a farm near Hoopeston, Illinois. Fraley attended the University of Illinois for both his bachelors and PhD, the latter focused on microbiology and biochemistry, working with Professor Samuel Kaplan in the Department of Microbiology, and completed in 1979. He did post-doctoral research in biophysics at the University of California-San Francisco. By 1983 he was working at Monsanto, where he was able to use Agrobacterium tumefaciens to transfer genes conferring a selectable marker into the cells of petunia plants.

Recognition 

 In 1988 Fraley was elected a fellow of the American Association for the Advancement of Science.
 Fraley received The Progressive Farmer's Man of the Year in 1995.
 In 1999 he was awarded he National Medal of Technology by President Bill Clinton.
 In 2008, he received the NAS Award for the Industrial Application of Science "for developing technologies that enabled the production of the world's first transgenic crops."
 In 2009, he received the Biotechnology Heritage Award from the Biotechnology Industry Organization (BIO) and the Chemical Heritage Foundation.
 Fraley won the 2013 World Food Prize for "breakthrough achievements in founding, developing, and applying modern agricultural biotechnology".
Fraley was inducted as a Laureate of The Lincoln Academy of Illinois and awarded the Order of Lincoln (the State’s highest honor) by the Governor of Illinois on June 19, 2021.

References

21st-century American biologists
American chief technology officers
University of Illinois alumni
Monsanto employees
Living people
1953 births
Agriculture and food award winners